The women's team event at the 2020 Summer Olympics in Tokyo, Japan, will take place at the Tokyo Aquatics Centre on 6 and 7 August 2021. It will be the 7th time the women's team event is held at the Olympic Games.

Russian synchronized swimmers are the five-time defending champions in that event.

Competition format

Only one round of competition is held. Each team will perform a technical routine and a free routine. The scores from the two routines are added together to decide the overall winners. Both free and technical routines starting lists are decided by random draw.

The technical routine must be completed in between 2 minutes 35 seconds and 3 minutes 5 seconds. There are 3 panels of 5 judges for each routine. In the technical routine, one panel each considers execution (30% of score), impression (30%), and elements (40%). The execution and impression judges each give a single score, while the elements judges give a score for each element. Scores are between 0 and 10, with 0.1 point increments. The highest and lowest score from each panel (including within each element, for the elements panel) are discarded. The remaining scores are averaged and weighted by the percentage for that panel, with element scores weighted within the element panel by degree of difficulty. The maximum possible score is 100. The routine must contain two highlight moves, one with the full team and one with the team split into subgroups. It must also contain a cadence, a circle, and a straight line. There are 5 required elements, which must be done in order:

 Difficulty 2.5: Starting in Submerged Back Pike position. A thrust to Vertical, then maintaining height while a leg is bent to Bent Knee Vertical. A 360 degree spin as the leg is extended back to Vertical.
 Difficulty 2.2: Starting in Vertical position. One full twist, then a 1440 degree continuous spin. 
 Difficulty 2.6: A Cyclone into Vertical position. Legs lowered into Split position. Walkover Front to finish.
 Difficulty 3.1: A Flamingo into Surface Flamingo position. Keeping leg vertical, transition into Fishtail position. A 180 degree rotation while lifting other leg to Vertical position. Transitions to Bent Knee Surface Arch and then Surface Arch positions with continuous Arch to Back Layout Finish Action.
 Difficulty 2.5: Starting in Submerged Back Pike position. Perform a Barracuda Airborne Split.

The free routine time limits are 3 minutes 45 seconds to 4 minutes 15 seconds. There is no restriction on the routine, except that there is a maximum of 6 acrobatic movements. The 3 panels for the free routine consider execution (30% of score), artistic impression (40%), and difficulty (30%). Each judge gives a single score. The highest and lowest score from each panel are discarded, with the remaining scores averaged and weighted. The maximum possible score is 100.

Qualification 

A total of 10 teams qualify for the event. The 2 National Olympic Committees (NOC) with the best result at the 2019 World Aquatics Championships qualify. Each continent also received one dedicated duet place; Africa and Oceania used the 2019 World Aquatics Championships to determine their selections, while the 2019 Pan American Games and the 2019 European Champions Cup served as qualifiers for the Americas and Europe. The Asia spot was guaranteed to the Olympic host, Japan. The final 3 places will be determined through a 2020 Olympic Qualification Tournament.

Schedule 

All times are Japan Standard Time (UTC+9)

The schedule for the women's team event covers two consecutive days of competition.

Results

Notes

References

2020
2020 in women's sport